NTT West Kyoto Soccer Club was a Japanese football club based in Kyoto. The club played in Japan Soccer League Division 2. It last played in the Kyoto Prefectural League since 2003.

Club name
?–1984 : NTT Kinki SC
1985–1998 : NTT Kansai SC
1999–2011 : NTT West Kyoto SC

External links
Football of Japan

Football clubs in Japan
Japan Soccer League clubs
Sports teams in Kyoto Prefecture
Nippon Telegraph and Telephone
Defunct football clubs in Japan
Works association football clubs in Japan